Michaël Heylen (born 3 January 1994) is a Belgian professional footballer who plays as a centre-back for Eredivisie club Emmen.

Club career
Heylen joined Anderlecht in 2007 from Germinal Beerschot. As a 16-year-old he was diagnosed with Crohn's disease. However, he made it to the reserve team and became its captain. In 2013, Anderlecht decided to loan Heylen out to Kortrijk for the 2013–14 season. He made his full debut at 14 September 2013 against Gent in a 3–0 home win.

On 6 July 2022, Heylen returned to Emmen on a two-year deal.

International career
In August 2016 he was asked to train with the senior Belgium squad by new manager Roberto Martinez.

References

External links

1994 births
Living people
Association football central defenders
Belgian footballers
Belgium under-21 international footballers
R.S.C. Anderlecht players
K.V. Kortrijk players
K.V.C. Westerlo players
S.V. Zulte Waregem players
FC Emmen players
Sparta Rotterdam players
Belgian Pro League players
Eredivisie players
Belgian expatriate footballers
Expatriate footballers in the Netherlands
Belgian expatriate sportspeople in the Netherlands